Risk IT, published in 2009 by ISACA, provides an end-to-end, comprehensive view of all risks related to the use of information technology (IT) and a similarly thorough treatment of risk management, from the tone and culture at the top to operational issues. It is the result of a work group composed of industry experts and academics from different nations, from organizations such as Ernst & Young, IBM, PricewaterhouseCoopers, Risk Management Insight, Swiss Life, and KPMG.

Definition 
IT risk is a part of business risk — specifically, the business risk associated with the use, ownership, operation, involvement, influence and adoption of IT within an enterprise. It consists of IT-related events that could potentially impact the business. It can occur with both uncertain frequency and magnitude, and it creates challenges in meeting strategic goals and objectives.

Management of business risk is an essential component of the responsible administration of any organization.
Owing to IT's importance to the overall business, IT risk should be treated like other key business risks.

The Risk IT framework explains IT risk and enables users to:
 Integrate the management of IT risk with the overall ERM
 Compare assessed IT risk with risk appetite and risk tolerance of the organization
 Understand how to manage the risk

IT risk is to be managed by all the key business leaders inside the organization: it is not just a technical issue of IT department.

IT risk can be categorised in different ways:
IT Benefit/Value enabler
risks related to missed opportunity to increase business value by IT enabled or improved processes
IT Programme/Project delivery
risks related to the management of IT related projects intended to enable or improve business: i.e. the risk of over budget or late delivery (or not delivery at all) of these projects
IT Operation and Service Delivery
risks associated to the day by day operations and service delivery of IT that can bring issues, inefficiency to the business operations of an organization

The Risk IT framework is based on the principles of enterprise risk management standards/frameworks such as Committee of Sponsoring Organizations of the Treadway Commission ERM and ISO 31000. In this way IT risk could be understood by upper management.

Risk IT principles 
Risk IT is built around the following principles:
 always align with business objectives
 align the IT risk management with ERM
 balance the costs and benefits of IT risk management
 promote fair and open communication of IT risks
 establish the right tone at the top while defining and enforcing accountability
 are a continuous process and part of daily activities

IT risk communication components 
Major IT risk communication flows are:
 Expectation: what the organization expects as final result and what are the expected behaviour of employee and management; It encompasses strategy, policies, procedures, awareness training
 Capability: it indicates how the organization is able to manage the risk
 Status: information of the actual status of IT risk; It encompasses risk profile of the organization, key risk indicator (KRI), events, root cause of loss events.
An effective information should be:
 Clear
 Concise
 Useful
 Timely
 Aimed at the correct target audience
 Available on a need to know basis

Risk IT domains and processes 
The three domains of the Risk IT framework are listed below with the contained processes (three by domain); each process contains a number of activities:
Risk Governance: Ensure that IT risk management practices are embedded in the enterprise, enabling it to secure optimal risk-adjusted return. It is based on the following processes:
 RG1 Establish and Maintain a Common Risk View
 RG1.1 Perform enterprise IT risk assessment
 RG1.2 Propose IT risk tolerance thresholds
 RG1.3 Approve IT risk tolerance
 RG1.4 Align IT risk policy
 RG1.5 Promote IT risk aware culture
 RG1.6 Encourage effective communication of IT risk
 RG2 Integrate With ERM
 RG2.1 Establish and maintain accountability for IT risk management
 RG2.2 Coordinate IT risk strategy and business risk strategy
 RG2.3 Adapt IT risk practices to enterprise risk practices
 RG2.4 Provide adequate resources for IT risk management
 RG2.5 Provide independent assurance over IT risk management
 RG3 Make Risk-aware Business Decisions
 RG3.1 Gain management buy in for the IT risk analysis approach
 RG3.2 Approve IT risk analysis
 RG3.3 Embed IT risk consideration in strategic business decision making
 RG3.4 Accept IT risk
 RG3.5 Prioritise IT risk response activities
Risk Evaluation: Ensure that IT-related risks and opportunities are identified, analysed and presented in business terms. It is based on the following processes:
 RE1 Collect Data
 RE1.1 Establish and maintain a model for data collection
 RE1.2 Collect data on the operating environment
 RE1.3 Collect data on risk events
 RE1.4 Identify risk factors
 RE2 Analyse Risk
 RE2.1 Define IT risk analysis scope
 RE2.2 Estimate IT risk
 RE2.3 Identify risk response options
 RE2.4 Perform a peer review of IT risk analysis
 RE3 Maintain Risk Profile
 RE3.1 Map IT resources to business processes
 RE3.2 Determines business criticality of IT resources
 RE3.3 Understand IT capabilities
 RE3.4 Update risk scenario components
 RE3.5 Maintain the IT risk register and iT risk map
 RE3.6 Develop IT risk indicators
 Risk Response: Ensure that IT-related risk issues, opportunities and events are addressed in a cost-effective manner and in line with business priorities. It is based on the following processes:
 RR1 Articulate Risk
 RR1.1 Communicate IT risk analysis results
 RR1.2 Report IT risk management activities and state of compliance
 RR1.3 Interpret independent IT assessment findings
 RR1.4 Identify IT related opportunities
 RR2 Manage Risk
 RR2.1 Inventory controls
 RR2.2 Monitor operational alignment with risk tolerance thresholds
 RR2.3 Respond to discovered risk exposure and opportunity
 RR2.4 Implement controls
 RR2.5 Report IT risk action plan progress
 RR3 React to Events
 RR3.1 Maintain incident response plans
 RR3.2 Monitor IT risk
 RR3.3 Initiate incident response
 RR3.4 Communicate lessons learned from risk events

Each process is detailed by:
 Process components
 Management practice
 Inputs and Outputs
 RACI charts
 Goal and metrics

For each domain a Maturity Model is depicted.

Risk evaluation 
The link between IT risk scenarios and ultimate business impact needs to be established to understand the effect of adverse events. Risk IT does not prescribe a single method. Different methods are available. Among them there are:
 COBIT Information criteria
 Balanced scorecard
 Extended balanced scorecard
 Westerman 
 COSO
 Factor Analysis of Information Risk

Risk scenarios 
Risk scenarios is the hearth of risk evaluation process. Scenarios can be derived in two different and complementary ways:
 a top-down approach from the overall business objectives to the most likely risk scenarios that can impact them.
 a bottom-up approach where a list of generic risk scenarios are applied to the organizaztion situation
Each risk scenarios is analysed determining frequency and impact, based on the risk factors.

Risk response 
The purpose of defining a risk response is to bring risk in line with the overall defined risk appetite of the organization after risk analysis: i.e. the residual risk should be within the risk tolerance limits.

The risk can be managed according to four main strategies (or a combination of them):
 Risk avoidance, exiting the activities that give rise to the risk
 Risk mitigation, adopting measures to detect, reduce the frequency and/or impact of the risk
 Risk transfer, transferring to others part of the risk, by outsourcing dangerous activities or by insurance
 Risk acceptance: deliberately running the risk that has been identified, documented and measured.

Key risk indicators are metrics capable of showing that the organizaztion is subject or has a high probability of being subject to a risk that exceeds the defined risk appetite.

Practitioner Guide 
The second important document about Risk IT is the Practitioner Guide.
It is made up of eight sections:
 Defining a Risk Universe and Scoping Risk Management
 Risk Appetite and Risk Tolerance
 Risk Awareness, Communication and Reporting
 Expressing and Describing Risk
 Risk Scenarios
 Risk Response and Prioritisation
 A Risk Analysis Workflow
 Mitigation of IT Risk Using COBIT and Val IT

Relationship with other ISACA frameworks 
Risk IT Framework complements ISACA’s COBIT, which provides a comprehensive framework for the control and governance of business-driven information-technology-based (IT-based) solutions and services. While COBIT sets good practices for the means of risk management by providing a set of controls to mitigate IT risk, Risk IT sets good practices for the ends by providing a framework for enterprises to identify, govern and manage IT risk.

Val IT allows business managers to get business value from IT investments, by providing a governance framework. VAL IT can be used to evaluate the actions determined by the Risk management process.

Relationship with other frameworks 
Risk IT accept Factor Analysis of Information Risk terminology and evaluation process.

ISO 27005 
For a comparison of Risk IT processes and those foreseen by ISO/IEC 27005 standard, see IT risk management#Risk management methodology and IT risk management#ISO 27005 framework

ISO 31000 
The Risk IT Practitioner Guide appendix 2 contains the comparison with ISO 31000

COSO 
The Risk IT Practitioner Guide appendix 4 contains the comparison with COSO

See also 

 COBIT
 COSO
 Enterprise risk management
 Factor analysis of information risk (FAIR)
 ISACA
 ISO 31000
 Risk
 Risk appetite
 Risk factor (computing)
 Risk management
 Risk tolerance
 Val IT

References

External links 
 Risk IT main page on ISACA web site

Risk analysis methodologies
Information technology governance
IT risk management